Grand Canyon is a 1958 American short documentary film directed by James Algar and produced by Walt Disney Productions. The film producer was Ernst Heiniger, assisted by his wife Jeanne. It was shown as a supplement during Sleeping Beauty's initial run. The short won an Oscar at the 31st Academy Awards in 1959 for Best Short Subject (Live Action). It is also included as a bonus feature on the 1997 laserdisc, 2003 DVD, and 2008 DVD & Blu-ray releases of Sleeping Beauty.

According to the opening credits, Grand Canyon is "a pictorial interpretation of Ferde Grofé's Grand Canyon Suite", much as the animated segments in Fantasia are pictorial representations of music, and the film is strongly related to its soundtrack. Grand Canyon is one of Walt Disney's more unconventional and experimental works, as it has musical accompaniment, but no dialogue or narration.

References

External links 
 
 

1958 films
1958 documentary films
1950s short documentary films
American short documentary films
Live Action Short Film Academy Award winners
Disney documentary films
Short films directed by James Algar
Films produced by Walt Disney
Works about the Grand Canyon
Films without speech
Films set in Arizona
Disney short films
Documentary films about Arizona
CinemaScope films
1950s English-language films
1950s American films